HMS Wave was a reciprocating engine-powered  built for the Royal Navy during the Second World War. She survived the war and was scrapped, in 1962.

Design and description
The ships' complement consisted of 85 officers and ratings.

The reciprocating ships had two vertical triple-expansion steam engines, each driving one shaft, using steam provided by two Admiralty three-drum boilers.

The Algerine class was armed with a QF  Mk V anti-aircraft gun and four twin-gun mounts for Oerlikon 20 mm cannon. The latter guns were in short supply when the first ships were being completed and they often got a proportion of single mounts. By 1944, single-barrel Bofors 40 mm mounts began replacing the twin 20 mm mounts on a one for one basis. All of the ships were fitted for four throwers and two rails for depth charges.

Construction and career

Wave was laid down by Lobnitz & Co.  of Renfrew, Scotland, on 17 March 1944. She was launched on 18 August of that year and completed on 14 November, a build time of just 8 months and 28 days.

Wave joined the 10th Minesweeping Flotilla, and in January 1945 took part in operations off Norway. She was sent to the Far East in October 1945, returning to Britain in 1946, when she joined the Fishery Protection Squadron.

On 30 September 1952, Wave was sheltering in St Ives Bay during a storm when her anchor chain broke. She was driven ashore in the town of St Ives, Cornwall, with her hull being holed. Sixty-two of her crew were taken off by breeches buoy, while the remaining 32, including the ship's officers remaining onboard until she was salvaged by two Boom defence vessels and taken to Devonport dockyard for repair. From December 1956 to July 1958, Wave was the Senior Officer's Ship of the Fishery Protection Squadron.

Wave was scrapped by King at Gateshead from 4 April 1962.

References

Bibliography

External links
HMS Wave at uboat.net
  HMS Wave at battleships-cruisers.co.uk
"H.M.S. Wave Aground". British Pathé  - via Youtube

 

Algerine-class minesweepers of the Royal Navy
World War II minesweepers of the United Kingdom
1944 ships
Ships built on the River Clyde